El Porvenir is the modern name for a ruined city of the pre-Columbian Maya civilization located in the Petén department of Guatemala. Ron Canter, in his paper "The Usumacinta River Portages in the Maya Classical Period" argues that El Porvenir was the first point at which the ancient Maya portaged to avoid the unnavigable portions of the Usumacinta River. A fragment of stone found at the site and aptly called the "El Porvenir Fragment" was also discovered that bore the name of Ha' K'in Xook, the sixth ajaw of Piedras Negras, suggesting a connection to the site.

References

External links
Entry on Mesoweb

Maya sites in Petén Department
Former populated places in Guatemala
Archaeological sites in Guatemala
Classic period in Mesoamerica